Lime commonly refers to:
 Lime (fruit), a green citrus fruit
 Lime (material), inorganic materials containing calcium, usually calcium oxide or calcium hydroxide
 Lime (color), a color between yellow and green

Lime may also refer to:

Botany
 Australian lime, a species of Citrus that are native to Australia and Papua New Guinea
 Key lime, a citrus hybrid with a spherical fruit
 Persian lime, a citrus fruit species of hybrid origin
 Tilia, a genus of trees known in Britain as lime trees, lime-wood, basswood, or linden
 Wild lime or Zanthoxylum fagara, a green fruit native to the Americas

Chemistry
 Agricultural lime, a soil additive containing calcium carbonate and other ingredients
 Birdlime, a sticky substance spread on branches to trap small birds
 Calcium hydroxide, a.k.a. slaked lime, slack lime, limewater, pickling lime or hydrated lime
 Hydraulic lime, used to make lime mortar
 Limewater, saturated calcium hydroxide solution
 Calcium oxide, a.k.a. burnt lime or quicklime

Surname
 Harold Lime (1928–2008), American pornographic film director
 Rickey Lime (born 1980), American musician
 Yvonne Lime (born 1935), American former actress; philanthropist

Places
 Lime, Oregon, United States
 Limé, a French commune in the Aisne departments
 Lime Lake Township, Minnesota, United States
 Lime Township, Blue Earth County, Minnesota, United States
 Orio al Serio Airport, ICAO code LIME

Arts, entertainment, and media

Music
 Lime (Arvingarna album), a 1999 album by Swedish dansband Arvingarna
 Lime (band), a Canadian synthpop duo
 Lime (Korean singer), Kim Hye-lim (born 1993), South Korean female singer, a member of the girl group Hello Venus

Television
 Lime Pictures, a TV production company
 Lime TV, a website and former television network

Other uses in arts, entertainment, and media
 Lime (magazine), an Asian lifestyle magazine
 Lime (video game company), a sister brand of the Japanese adult video game company Navel
 Lime, a 1996 Saber Marionette J character
 Harry Lime, a character in 1949 film The Third Man

Brands and enterprises
 LIME (telecommunications company), a Caribbean telecommunications company
 Lime (transportation company), a company which operates dockless bicycle and scooter sharing systems

Technology
 Lime (test framework), a PHP testing framework
 LIME, an acronym for "Landline, Internet, Mobile, Entertainment", used in the Internet industry

Other uses
 LIME Sports Club, a cricket club in Barbados

See also
 Limes (disambiguation)
 Lime Creek (disambiguation)
 Lime Grove (disambiguation)
 Lime Kiln (disambiguation), several places
 Lime Lake (disambiguation)
 Lime Ridge (disambiguation)
 Lime Street (disambiguation)
 
 Lyme (disambiguation)